Karstia is a genus of Asian ray spiders that was first described by H. M. Chen in 2010.

Species
 it contains five species, found in China:
Karstia coddingtoni (Zhu, Zhang & Chen, 2001) – China
Karstia cordata Dou & Lin, 2012 – China
Karstia nitida Zhao & Li, 2012 – China
Karstia prolata Zhao & Li, 2012 – China
Karstia upperyangtzica Chen, 2010 (type) – China

See also
 List of Theridiosomatidae species

References

Further reading

Araneomorphae genera
Spiders of China
Theridiosomatidae